Paradental cysts constitute a family of inflammatory odontogenic cyst, that typically appear in relation to crown or root of partially erupted molar tooth. When the cyst is developed in the distal region of partially erupted third molar or in other locations in the dentition, it called simply paradental cyst, but the unique cyst that developed in the buccal bifurcation region of the mandibular first molars in the second half of the first decade of life is called buccal bifurcation cyst and has unique clinical features and management considerations in comparison to the other paradental cysts.

See also
Cyst
Odontogenic cyst

References

Cysts of the oral and maxillofacial region